Epworth HealthCare is a provider of acute medical, surgical and rehabilitation services in Melbourne, Australia. The group has four divisions: Epworth Richmond, Epworth Eastern, Epworth Cliveden, Epworth Freemasons and Epworth Geelong Epworth Rehabilitation, with rehabilitation sites at Richmond, Camberwell, Brighton and Geelong, Victoria. With over 1,200 beds and more than 4,000 staff, Epworth HealthCare is Victoria's largest not-for-profit private hospital group.

Early History
Epworth Hospital opened in March 1920, as a 25-bed community hospital initiated by the Annual Methodist Conference. The first matron was Ethel Gray, a Melbourne-trained nurse who had recently returned from serving as a matron in hospitals in France and England during World War I.  A donation of £6,000 by Sir Aaron Danks led to the purchase of the mansion "Yallcowinna", situated in one and half acres of gardens in Erin Street Richmond. Renovations to convert the mansion into a hospital cost £3,324, part of which was donated by Dr. Georgina Sweet and her father in memory of Dr Margaret Sweet who "gave her life during the 1919 influenza epidemic". The influence of the Methodist traditions can be found in the name Epworth, as this was the name of the village where John Wesley, founder of the Methodist Church, was born.

There proved to be such a need for the hospital that within five months of opening patients were being turned away, and nursing accommodation was converted into patient accommodation with nursing staff housed onsite in tents while renovations were undertaken to increase the number of beds. 

Epworth Hospital was situated immediately next to the former Salvation Army Hospital Bethesda.  Bethesda, meaning "place of healing" was originally opened in 1906 for the care of the sick and needy in Richmond and Collingwood.  In 1910 Bethesda Hospital was registered as the first non-public Nurse training School in Australia. Epworth established a general nursing training school soon after opening in 1921.  Training initially consisted of 3 years at Epworth plus a further year at Fairfield Infectious Diseases Hospital  It was the last private hospital to run an apprentice-style general training school in Australia, the final group graduating in early 1988.    

The first major works included extending the patient accommodation by adding wings on the original mansion, with wide verandahs featuring arches and rendered in stucco: these have since been glassed in where they survived and can be seen from the Erin Street perspective.  The original floors in patient areas featured hardwood parquetry and remained in place in Ward 1 East until it was renovated to establish the first private Accident and Emergency department in Australia in the 1990s. The matron had a private apartment located in the fourth-floor attic space of the mansion.  A four-storey building for nurse accommodation was built in the late 1920s, as well as a separate building for domestic staff accommodation located towards the rear of the property, which later housed the school of nursing.  Both were demolished in the 1990s to make way for additional patient accommodation.

1980s Redevelopment

In 1980, Epworth was incorporated under an Act of the Victorian Parliament, The Epworth Foundation Act (1980) as amended, and was amended in 1997 to create the Epworth Foundation as the principal entity under the Act. The Foundation Act in 1980 enabled the development of the six-level "south block", which opened in 1982 and included three floors of 50 beds (divided into two wards each comprising 3 shared rooms of 4 beds each and 13 private rooms with ensuite) an intensive care unit, and an operating suite comprising seven spacious theatres, as well as a new kitchen, staff cafeteria, and stores area in the basement. Building works have continued apace throughout Epworth's development, and are continuing with further development of new wards and medical centres throughout the Group.    

In 1998 Epworth acquired Bethesda Hospital from The Salvation Army. With the opening of the Epworth Centre, built across the boundaries of the two older hospitals, full integration into a single entity was achieved for the Richmond campus. This meant Epworth Richmond had become the largest not for profit private hospital on one site anywhere in Australia.

Early in 2002 Epworth acquired Box Hill Gardens Medical Centre and Day Surgery Unit, which is now staffed and managed by Epworth HealthCare. In September 2003 the Group acquired Brighton Rehabilitation Centre, now known as Epworth Rehabilitation Brighton, expanding the current number of rehabilitation beds and services available for patients and establishing a musculoskeletal research centre. Epworth opened the Tattersall's Cancer Centre in partnership with Peter MacCallum, to become Australia's most advanced radiotherapy centre.

In 2004 Epworth became the first hospital in Australia to acquire a state-of-the-art robotic surgical system. A Gastrointestinal Oncology Centre was established in 2005. Epworth Eastern in Box Hill was completed and officially opened by the federal minister for health, Tony Abbott on 2 August 2005. Epworth was awarded the 2005 Australian Private Hospitals Award for Quality and Excellence. The entire Epworth group was recognised in this award for clinical excellence.

The Epworth Breast Service also opened in 2005, with a multidisciplinary team offering a patient centred service specialising in breast disease.  In July the new Acquired Brain Injury (ABI) Unit opened as part of Epworth Rehabilitation. Epworth Freemasons became part of the Group in May 2006, bringing Epworth's overall bed capacity to more than 1,150. Epworth Rehabilitation expanded to include a site at Camberwell with the purchase of Cedar Court in August.

Epworth Richmond
Epworth Richmond has over 700 beds and is equipped with quality facilities and latest technologies including a 39-bed Intensive Care Unit, 32 operating theatres, Australia's first da Vinci robotic system, day surgery facilities, catheter laboratories, community care and Hospital in the Home. With over 42,000 admissions, more than 6000 staff members and 1200 accredited visiting specialists, Epworth Richmond is a leading healthcare provider in Australia.

The Epworth Richmond Emergency Department is the only private emergency department in Victoria that is accredited to accept time-critical patients. Annually, the Emergency Department treats more than 28,000 patients.

Epworth Eastern
Epworth Eastern, situated in Box Hill is the largest not-for-profit private hospital in Melbourne's Eastern Corridor. Opened in 2005, this state of the art hospital has 223 beds, an 8-bed Intensive Care Unit, a 6-bed Coronary Care Unit and private rooms. Its principal focus is on cardiac, vascular, orthopaedic and general surgery, oncology, urology and endoscopy services.

Epworth Eastern maintains state of the art equipment, including one of Epworth's two Da Vinci robotic surgical systems, digital operating suites, a computerised medication administration system, and operates in a fully wireless environment.

Epworth Eastern features a day medical unit offering oncology, scalp cooling, haematology and infusions.

Epworth Eastern provides a Mandarin speaking concierge service.

Epworth Freemasons

Epworth Freemasons operates on two sites in East Melbourne – Clarendon Street and Victoria Parade. Its facilities include 210 inpatient beds, a Day Procedure Centre and a Critical Care Unit.

A key speciality is women's and related health services including maternity, women's health and breast clinics, breast and gynaecological surgery and in-vitro fertilisation. Epworth Freemasons offers comprehensive cancer care, and a full range of surgical services.

Epworth Rehabilitation
Epworth Rehabilitation operates from six locations – Richmond, Hawthorn, Brighton, Camberwell, Thornbury and Dandenong, with a multidisciplinary team offering both inpatient and outpatient programs to cater to the needs of a range of rehabilitation patients.

Epworth Rehabilitation is one of the largest private sector rehabilitation services in Australia specialising in the clinical management of patients following hip and knee joint replacement, orthopaedic surgery, neurological events such as stroke, cardiac events, acquired brain injury and pain management issues.

Associations
The Epworth Sleepiness Scale by Dr. Murray Johns is named after this hospital group.

References

External links 

Hospital networks in Australia
1920 establishments in Australia
Hospitals in Victoria (Australia)